The A Very Potter Musical album contains the songs from the Harry Potter parody musical A Very Potter Musical, produced by StarKid Productions with music and lyrics by Darren Criss (who also starred in the musical as Harry Potter) and A.J. Holmes (who played piano in the band), and book by Matt Lang, Nick Lang, and Brian Holden. It was recorded by the musical's cast and was released digitally through the group's official site in 2009 and later on their Bandcamp site on July 29, 2010.

Track listing

Writing credits

Personnel

Featured Performers

Band
 A.J. Holmes – piano
 Carlos Valdes – bass
 Joe Carroll – drums, guitar

Release history

Other appearances
 The song "Harry" was previously released as "Sami" for the web-series Little White Lie (2009), and was later re-recorded for Darren Criss' Human EP and A Very StarKid Album, once again as "Sami."
 Darren Criss also re-recorded "Not Alone" for his Human EP and A Very StarKid Album.

References

External links
 StarKid Productions official website
 Star Kid Productions on YouTube

Works based on Harry Potter
StarKid Productions albums
Cast recordings
Theatre soundtracks
2009 soundtrack albums
Fantasy parodies